= Starfish Foundation =

Non-profit organization

The Starfish Foundation is a Greek non-profit organization and was founded by restaurant owner Melinda McRostie in October 2015 in response to the refugee crisis. Its local members started helping refugee shipwreck survivors brought in by the Hellenic Coast Guard in late 2014. Molyvos is located on the island Lesvos was one of the towns with the biggest influx of refugees in 2015. The foundation ran OXY transit camp in the north of the island in late 2015, through which numerous refugees passed in less than 4 months. The Starfish Foundation currently coordinates the response to shipwreck emergencies, and has volunteers working in Apanemo camp run by the IRC in the north of the island, and inside registration centre Moria in the south of the island.

The Starfish Foundation was originally funded by tourists who paid off supermarket bills, but is now formally registered in Greece (EL997256514) and receives funding from private people around the world. The foundation is called Asterias in Greek, and aims to help not only refugees, but also locals coping with the crisis.
